Superior Aviation is an American airline based in Lansing, Michigan, USA. It was established in 1979 and operates scheduled passenger services, passenger and cargo charter flights and aircraft sales and maintenance. In 2006 Martinaire acquires Superior Aviation.

Fleet 

As of August 2006 the Superior Aviation fleet includes:

External links 
Superior Aviation

References 

Charter airlines of the United States
Airlines established in 1979
Companies based in Lansing, Michigan
Regional airlines of the United States
Airlines based in Michigan
1979 establishments in Michigan
American companies established in 1979
Cargo airlines of the United States